Call You Cowboy is an American Western song written by Brenn Hill. It is also the name of the album on which the song was initially released.

"Call You Cowboy" is the title track of Hill's album Call You Cowboy, released in 2002 and nominated as Traditional Western Album of the Year 
by the Western Music Association. Members of the Western Writers of America chose it as one of the Top 100 Western songs of all time.

In the song, the singer talks to another person whose "father calls you a drifter, but I call you cowboy", then describes what are, to him, the attributes of a "cowboy" — intricacy, complexity, innovation, survivability, and unwillingness to conform.

Track listing

Personnel 
 Scotty Burns - violin
 Gary Carlson - electric bass
 Duke Davis - bass guitar
 Matt Flinner - mandolin
 Bruce Innes - acoustic guitar
 Rich O'Brien - guitars
 Andy Poling - percussion
 Jeffery Rew - upright bass
 Kenny Sears - dobro
 Wayne 'Bullhide' Shrubsall - banjo
 Ryan Shupe - mandolin
 Russell Terrell - background vocals
 Paul Todd - harmonica
 Byron Walcher - pedal steel guitar
 Brenn Hill - vocals, background vocals

References 

Songs about cowboys and cowgirls
2002 songs